Vijay Kale is an Indian politician and member of the Bharatiya Janata Party. He is a first term member of the Maharashtra Legislative Assembly.

Constituency
Vijay Kale was elected from the Shivajinagar assembly constituency, Maharashtra.

Positions held 
Maharashtra Legislative Assembly MLA.
Terms in office: 2014–2019.

References 

Bharatiya Janata Party politicians from Maharashtra
Maharashtra MLAs 2014–2019
Living people
Marathi politicians
Year of birth missing (living people)